Eldorado (English: “The Golden”) is a British soap opera created by Tony Holland from an original idea by John Dark and Verity Lambert of a glamorous, upmarket soap focusing on wealthy British expatriates similar to US soaps Dallas and Dynasty. The show ran for only one year, from 6 July 1992 to 9 July 1993. Set in the fictional town of Los Barcos on the Costa Eldorado in Spain and following the lives of British and European expatriates, the BBC hoped it would be as successful as EastEnders and replicate some of the sunshine and glamour of imported Australian soaps such as Home and Away and Neighbours.

A co-production between the BBC and independent production company Cinema Verity and J.Dark y J.Todesco, Eldorado aired three times a week in a high-profile evening slot on the mainstream channel BBC1, filling the slot vacated by Terry Wogan's chat show Wogan, on Mondays, Wednesdays and Fridays at 7.00 pm.

In spite of a high-profile advertising campaign on television, radio and in the press preceding the launch ('Are you ready for Eldorado?', read by actor Campbell Morrison), the programme was not initially a popular hit with viewers or critics.  Ratings improved with a radical overhaul, but it was eventually cancelled by the new controller of BBC1, Alan Yentob.

Creation

Eldorado was conceived originally from an idea by James Todesco, John Dark, and Verity Lambert, who pitched the show to EastEnders co-creators Tony Holland and Julia Smith. While Smith served as the series producer, Lambert was designated as the show's executive producer. At the time, Lambert had established her reputation as an in-house producer for the BBC, and had previously launched the BBC's successful science fiction television series Doctor Who. The original working title for the series was Little England.

Problems and criticism
Although the show featured many professional actors, such as Patricia Brake and Jesse Birdsall, many of the cast were inexperienced actors whose limitations were clearly exposed on such a new and ambitious project. German-born Kai Maurer had apparently never acted on stage or screen previously before being cast in the show. Prior to filming, some of the cast did not even know what a read-through was; the quality of the acting was derided by some tabloid newspapers and regularly mocked during the "film styles" round of comedy show Whose Line Is It Anyway?.

As a result of filming in bare-walled villas rather than a studio, there were many sound and acoustic problems, such as reverberation. Possibly in a bid to court media attention, the show opened with the controversial story of a middle-aged man, Bunny (played by Roger Walker), returning from the UK with a 17-year-old bride, Fizz (Kathy Pitkin); many viewers felt this storyline was implausible and sordid. On top of this, ITV decided to air a special one-hour edition of Coronation Street on the show's debut evening, reputedly an attempt by network executives to sabotage the programme.

As a result, the costly production – although not exorbitant by contemporary television standards – was used by critics of the television licence to argue that the BBC was feathering the nest of former employees. Due to the stresses of internal feuding, producer Julia Smith had a nervous breakdown and left the soap opera, to be replaced by Corinne Hollingworth, who had previously worked on EastEnders. Hollingworth brought about many changes to Eldorado by hiring new scriptwriters, creating extra rehearsal time, and removing many of the inexperienced and poor actors who had attracted criticism.

Cancellation
Despite the changes made by Hollingworth to rectify the soap opera's early problems (ratings improved over the course of the series' run), it was claimed that this was not enough to justify its continued production, and incoming controller of BBC1, Alan Yentob, cancelled the programme, which had been commissioned by his predecessor Jonathan Powell. Some involved in the programme's production believe that the motives for cancellation were mainly political; they believe that Eldorado was not representative of the more serious image of the BBC that incoming management wished to present, particularly in light of the forthcoming renewal of the BBC Charter.

In the UK, Eldorado is remembered as an embarrassing failure for the BBC, and is sometimes used as a byword for any unsuccessful, poorly received or over-hyped television programme. It is widely thought that the failure of Eldorado is the reason why the BBC has not attempted to launch a brand new prime-time soap opera from scratch since then, with the corporation opting instead to move established series Casualty and Holby City to year-round production.

The series ended with one of its star characters, Marcus Tandy (Jesse Birdsall), escaping an attempt on his life with his car being blown up, and sailing off into the distance on a boat with his girlfriend Pilar Moreno (Sandra Sandri). Some viewers noticed that the car that was blown up was not, in fact, the Renault Alpine A610 driven by Marcus, but a thinly disguised much older model, the Triumph TR7. The final line of dialogue, delivered by Tandy, was: 'You can't trust anyone these days, can you?'

Shortly after the final episode was transmitted, Adios Eldorado, a compilation video featuring highlights from the series, was released by the BBC. On its first week of release, it was the top-selling video in the chart at branches of Woolworths.

Later years
Eldorado was repeated on UK Gold between 1995 and 1996. It was repeated again in 2002. The set, situated near the village of Coín (which is located in the hills above the Costa del Sol), is still in existence, despite having lain empty for many years. Years following the demise of Eldorado, fans were able to tour the set. Humorously, Yentob commented that the tours and fan petitions for the series' return were more popular than the series itself. The set was then converted into a hotel complex called Hotel Ciudad Del Cine (Cinema City Hotel). The hotel continued to allow filming to take place; the set featured in the music video for the single Nothing on But The Radio by The Alice Band in 2002. The set has been used for various Spanish television serials both produced and broadcast in the region of Andalucía. The set has also been used for international recordings, including the Indian version of Fear Factor, which was shot in the Commercial Plaza. The site has also been used for airsoft shooting, and continues to be used for productions; it is now known as Ciudad Del Airsoft (Airsoft City). The beach and marina scenes were filmed at Puerto de Cabopino near Marbella. The majority of the other scenes were filmed at Mijas and Coín.

As of 15 July 2021, some episodes of Eldorado including the first and six final episodes became available in the UK on BritBox, a subscription digital video platform curated by the BBC and ITV and since December 2022, the same episodes also became available on ITVX.

Music
Following their collaboration on EastEnders, Julia Smith and Tony Holland commissioned Simon May to write the theme tune.  May reworked a song called "When You Go Away" which he had written for his ill-fated musical Mefisto, based on Goethe's Faust, adding Spanish guitars to make it more relevant to the Eldorado project. An instrumental version of the theme was used for the opening and closing credits. However, the vocal version of the song was recorded by Johnny Griggs, and was used over the closing credits of the final episode. "When You Go Away" was released as a single and included on the album New Vintage: The Best of Simon May, and the full instrumental version of the theme was included on the compilation album The Simon May Collection.

Main Cast

 Drew Lockhead – Campbell Morrison (1992–1993)
 Gwen Lockhead – Patricia Brake (1992–1993)
 Blair Lockhead – Josh Nathan (1992–1993)
 Nessa Lockhead – Julie Fernandez (1992–1993)
 Marcus Tandy – Jesse Birdsall (1992–1993)
 Joy Slater – Leslee Udwin (1992–1993)
 Trish Valentine – Polly Perkins (1992–1993)
 Ingrid Olsson – Bo Corre (1992–1993)
 Pilar Moreno – Sandra Sandri (1992–1993)
 Freddie Martin – Roland Curram (1992–1993)
 Rosemary Webb – Hilary Crane (1992–1993)
 Roberto Fernandez – Franco Rey (1992–1993)
 Rosario Fernandez – Stella Maris (1992–1993)
 Olive King – Faith Kent (1992–1993)
 Gerry Peters-Smith – Buki Armstrong (1992–1993)
 Isabelle Leduc – Framboise Gommendy (1992–1993)
 Per Svendsen – Kim Rømer (1992–1993)
 Stanley Webb – William Lucas (1992–1993)
 Lene Svendsen – Nanna Møller (1992–1993)
 Philippe Leduc – Daniel Lombart (1992–1993)
 Maria Fernandez – Maria Sanchez (1992–1993)
 Javier "Paco" Fernandez – Iker Ibanez (1992–1993)
 Snowy White – Patch Connolly (1992–1993)
 Trine Svendsen – Marchell Betak/Clare Wilkie (1992–1993)
 Arnaud Leduc – Mikael Philippe (1992–1993)
 Allan Hindle – Jon Morrey (1992)
 Terry Flynn – Ben Murphy (1992–1993)
 Gavin Hindle – Darren Newton (1992)
 Dieter Shultz – Kai Maurer (1992)
 Alex Morris – Derek Martin (1993)
 'Razor' Sharp – Kevin Hay (1993)
 Abuela Fernandez – María Vega (1992–1993)
 Natalie Jackson – Tessa Wojtczak (1992–1993)
 Fizz Charlson – Kathy Pitkin (1992)
 Sergio Munoz D'Avila – Alexander Torriglia (1993)
 Stephen Law – Stephen Hattersley (1992–1993)
 Roger Noble – Keith Bookman (1992–1993)
 Kitty Hindle – Jeannie Crowther (1992)
 Anna Svendsen – Grethe Holmer (1993)
 Ranjit Singh – Amerjit Deu (1992)
 Jaskaran Singh – Ravi Aujla (1992)
 Maribel Fernandez – Barbara Bonelli (1992–1993)
 Pablo Fernandez – Jorge Cano (1992–1993)
 Susan Wilkinson – Fiona Walker (1993)
 Clive Mitchell – Charlie Condou (1992)

See also
Albion Market

References

External links

The Unofficial Eldorado Website
'TV Cream' on Eldorado

1990s British television soap operas
1992 British television series debuts
1993 British television series endings
BBC television dramas
British television soap operas
Television shows set in Spain
English-language television shows
Television shows filmed in Spain